The 1945 Victorian state election was held in the Australian state of Victoria on Saturday 10 November 1945 to elect 65 members of the state's Legislative Assembly.

Results

Legislative Assembly

|}
Notes:
Eleven seats were uncontested at this election, and were retained by the incumbent parties:
Labor (8): Bendigo, Collingwood, Footscray, Geelong, Melbourne, Moonee Ponds, Northcote, Sunshine.
Liberal (3): Kew, Malvern, Scoresby

See also
Candidates of the 1945 Victorian state election
1946 Victorian Legislative Council election

References

1945 elections in Australia
Elections in Victoria (Australia)
1940s in Victoria (Australia)
November 1945 events in Australia